Comibaena is a genus of moths in the family Geometridae. It was described by Jacob Hübner in 1823.

Description
It differs from Agathia in the antennae being bipectinated (comb like on both sides) to three-fourths length in both sexes. The hind tibia of the male is not dilated. Hindwings with veins 6 and 7 stalked.

Species
 Comibaena albimarginata (Warren, 1893)
 Comibaena amoenaria (Oberthür, 1880)
 Comibaena argentataria Leech, 1897
 Comibaena attenuata (Warren, 1896)
 Comibaena bajularia (Denis & Schiffermüller, 1775) – blotched emerald
 Comibaena biplaga Walker, 1861
 Comibaena cassidara (Guenée, 1857)
 Comibaena cheramota Meyrick
 Comibaena connata (Warren, 1898)
 Comibaena delicatior (Warren, 1897)
 Comibaena diluta (Warren, 1895)
 Comibaena falcipennis (Yazaki, 1991)
 Comibaena fuscidorsata Prout, 1912
 Comibaena leucochloraria (Mabille, 1880)
 Comibaena leucospilata Walker
 Comibaena longipennis Warren
 Comibaena mariae (Lucas, 1888)
 Comibaena meyricki Prout
 Comibaena pictipennis Bulter, 1880
 Comibaena procumbaria (Pryer, 1877)
 Comibaena pseudoneriaria Wehrli, 1926
 Comibaena punctaria (Swinhoe, 1904)
 Comibaena quadrinotata Butler, 1889
 Comibaena rhodolopha Prout, 1915
 Comibaena serrulata D. S. Fletcher, 1963
 Comibaena subdelicata Inoue, 1985
 Comibaena takasago Okana, 1960
 Comibaena tancrei Graeser, 1889
 Comibaena tenuisaria (Graeser, 1888)

References

 
 

Comibaenini
Geometridae genera